Gıyâseddîn Halil Bey (reigned 1485–1511) was the tenth bey of the Ramadanids who ruled the beylik of Adana. The son of Dâvûd Bey, who was killed in Aleppo in 1480, Halil Bey focused his reign on maintaining peace between the Mamluk Sultanate and the Ottoman Empire and creating an environment where Islamic scholarship and architecture flourished. He was noted for his generosity and was named Gıyâseddîn on honour of his love for his subjects. Halil Bey died in 1511 and was succeeded by his brother Mahmûd Bey.

References

Anatolian beyliks
15th-century monarchs in the Middle East
Year of birth unknown
1511 deaths